The yellow Irish lord (Hemilepidotus jordani) is a species of marine ray-finned fish belonging to the family Agonidae It is found in the northern Pacific Ocean.

Taxonomy
The yellow Irish lord was first formally described in 1881 by the American ichthyologist Tarleton Hoffman Bean with its type locality given as Ilyulyuk Unalaska Island in the Aleutian Islands of Alaska. Bean did not identify the identity of the person honored in the specific name but it is most likely to be David Starr Jordan.

Description

Dorsal coloration consists of alternating black and yellow stripes with small white spots laterally. The ventral surface is cream-colored. The fish has 11–12 dorsal spines, 18–23 dorsal soft rays and 35 vertebrae. There is an incision in the first dorsal fin. There are thin cirri on the upper lip.

Distribution and habitat
Hemilepidotus jordani lives in benthopelagic marine environments of the northern Pacific Ocean, between 66°N–54°N, and 154°E–134°W. This corresponds to the northern Kuril Islands and Kamchatka Peninsula to the Gulf of Anadyr and Sitka, Alaska.

Biology
The yellow Irish lord has a largely unknown biology. Examination of ovaries of female specimens suggest that these fish spawn once annually during the summer. They are predatory fishes which feed on a wide variety of prey, predominantly crabs, although the largest adults eat other fishes. They live to a reported maximum age of 30 years.

References

 

yellow Irish lord
Fish of the Pacific Ocean
yellow Irish lord
Taxa named by Tarleton Hoffman Bean